Nalanda International Cricket Stadium or Rajgir International stadium is an under construction cricket stadium and sports complex in Rajgir, Bihar. After completion of construction, this stadium will be the home of Bihar cricket team. The total capacity of the stadium will be 45,000 seats. Once the stadium is built, it will be the largest stadium in Bihar and the most modern as well. Apart from being used for cricket, the sports complex is also being developed in a way so it can also be used for other sports as well like football.

History
In 2018, it was announced by the Chief Minister of Bihar Nitish Kumar that an international cricket stadium will be constructed at Rajgir in Bihar's Nalanda district. On 12 October 2018, Nitish Kumar has laid the foundation stone of Rajgir international cricket stadium. The stadium will be the second stadium in Bihar that could host international matches after Moin-ul-Haq Stadium, and will be built on the model of Sydney Cricket Ground. The stadium will be built on 90 acres of land with an estimated cost of ₹633 Crore. It will serve as an international cricket stadium as well as a sports academy.

The construction should have been completed in 2022, but , only 40% of the works have been finished.

Sports complex and academy 
It will be state of art sports complex which will have the facilities for 28 indoor and outdoor games including cricket with all modern facilities like a research center, motivation center, sports library, swimming pool, cafeteria. This stadium will support twenty-five games including cricket, football and swimming.

See also

 Moin-ul-Haq Stadium
 Patna Golf Club
 Patliputra Sports Complex

References

Sports venues in Bihar
Cricket grounds in Bihar
Proposed sports venues in India
Proposed stadiums
Nalanda district
Rajgir